Pierre Dusart is a French mathematician at the Université de Limoges who specializes in number theory.

He has published in several countries, specially in South Korea, with his colleague Damien Sauveron who is associate professor in Computer Sciences at the Université de Limoges.

External links
Résumé and thesis:  (French)
"The kth prime is greater than k(ln k + ln ln k-1) for k>=2". Mathematics of Computation 68 (1999), pp. 411–415.
"ESTIMATES OF SOME FUNCTIONS OVER PRIMES".

Notes and references 

French mathematicians
Living people
Year of birth missing (living people)